Greg Childs (born March 10, 1990) is a former American football wide receiver. After playing college football for Arkansas, he was drafted by the Vikings in the fourth round of the 2012 NFL Draft.

Early years
Childs attended Warren High School in Warren, Arkansas, where he played football, basketball and ran track. He went to school with future University of Arkansas and Minnesota Vikings teammate Jarius Wright and Buffalo Bill player Chris Gragg. He was all state selection as a senior in 2007. In track, Childs was a standout triple jumper (top-jump of 13.60 meters).

College career
As a freshman in 2008, Childs played in 12 games with one start and had 18 receptions for 273 yards and two touchdowns. As a sophomore, he started eight of 13 games and led the team with 48 receptions for 894 yards and seven touchdowns. As a junior in 2010, he played in eight games and had 46 receptions for 659 yards and six touchdowns before suffering a season ending patellar tendon injury.

Professional career

2012 NFL Combine

2012 NFL Draft
Childs was drafted in the fourth round of the 2012 NFL Draft by the Minnesota Vikings.

Minnesota Vikings
On August 3, 2012, Childs suffered injuries to both knees while at training camp. An MRI revealed that both knees had a torn patellar tendon, as a result of which Childs was eliminated for his entire rookie season. The Vikings waived/injured Childs on August 5, 2012, and he was subsequently reverted to injured reserve on August 8.

On August 27, 2013, Childs was placed on the reserve/physically unable to perform list.

The Vikings released Childs on March 6, 2014

In May 2014, Childs went to Jaguars Rookie Mini-Camp on a tryout basis. He was not offered a contract.

Toronto Argonauts
Childs was signed to the Toronto Argonauts practice roster on September 10, 2014. He was released by the Argonauts on September 27, 2014.

References

External links
Minnesota Vikings bio
Arkansas Razorbacks bio

1990 births
Living people
American football wide receivers
African-American players of American football
Arkansas Razorbacks football players
Minnesota Vikings players
Players of American football from Arkansas
People from Warren, Arkansas
21st-century African-American sportspeople